Ballykelly may refer to:

Places
Ballykelly, County Londonderry, a village in Northern Ireland
Ballykelly, County Down, a townland in County Down, Northern Ireland
Ballykelly, County Antrim, a townland in County Antrim, Northern Ireland
Ballykelly, County Kildare, a village in County Kildare, Ireland

Other
RAF Ballykelly, a former Royal Air Force station in Ballykelly, County Londonderry; closed in 1971
RNAS Ballykelly (HMS Sealion), a former Royal Naval Air Station near Ballykelly, County Londonderry, Northern Ireland
Shackleton Barracks, a former military installation at Ballykelly, County Londonderry, Northern Ireland